Leprechaun 3 (also known as Leprechaun 3: In Vegas) is a 1995 American slasher comedy film and the third, and first direct-to-video installment, in the Leprechaun series. The film follows a psychotic leprechaun, who begins a killing spree in Las Vegas.

Leprechaun 3 became the highest-grossing direct-to-video film of 1995.

The film was followed by Leprechaun 4: In Space (1997).

Plot
At the beginning of the film, a stranger with a missing arm, leg, and eye sells a grotesque Leprechaun statue to a Las Vegas Pawnshop owner called Gupta. The figure has a golden medallion around its neck, which the shop owner removes despite being warned by the stranger not to. This action brings the leprechaun to life, and he attacks Gupta, biting his ear and toe before strangling him with a phone cord. As he is running away from the scene, the leprechaun drops one of his wish-granting gold coins.

Meanwhile, a college student, Scott McCoy, has just arrived in Las Vegas and falls for a woman called Tammy. He gives her a ride to her job at the Lucky Shamrock Casino. While in the casino, Scott gambles away all his money, so he goes to the local pawnshop to trade his Rolex watch for some quick cash. Upon reaching the pawnshop, Scott discovers Gupta's lifeless body on the floor and calls the police. He then unknowingly takes the leprechaun's coin and is granted one wish. A computer on the counter next to him states how in Irish folklore that one wish from a leprechaun's coin can give a mortal anything and that it remains permanent. When Scott hears this, he jokingly wishes for a winning streak.

Scott is instantly teleported back to the casino by the coin's magic, where he starts having a winning streak and realizes that his wish has come true; the coin later gets stolen by two casino employees, Loretta and Fazio. Scott then gets attacked by the leprechaun, who pursues his gold coin. In the process, their blood mixes and Scott manages to throw the leprechaun out of the hotel window, but he survives the fall. Due to the mixed blood, Scott begins to transform into a leprechaun.

Mitch, the Lucky Shamrock's owner, along with Loretta and Fazio, pass the coin around making wishes. Mitch wishes that he could have sex with Tammy and goes up to her room. While Mitch is kissing her, Loretta steals the golden coin; Tammy is broken free of its spell and leaves the room in a panic. The leprechaun then enters the room and turns on the television using his magic. A woman who looks like Tammy appears and starts to call Mitch's name. She comes out of the TV and kisses Mitch, who then hears the leprechaun's voice and looks up, discovering the woman is a robot just before she electrocutes him.

While in Fazio's dressing room, Loretta wishes to have her 20-year-old body back, and her wish comes true. The leprechaun then appears and asks her for his coin, but Loretta tells him she doesn’t have it anymore. He becomes infuriated and massively inflates her breasts, lips, and butt. Loretta hysterically cries and screams as she tries to escape from the leprechaun through an open door. She becomes wedged between its frame due to her blown-up body parts and tries to force herself through. Finally, the doorframe breaks into tiny pieces, which causes her to blow up.

Shortly after, Fazio, now in possession of the coin, wishes to be the world's greatest magician. During his show, the leprechaun appears, and the audience thinks he is part of the performance. He restrains Fazio in a box, and everyone in the crowd insists that they want to see the saw trick. Realizing that the leprechaun has an actual chainsaw and intended to cut him in half, Fazio wishes that he would be at Caesar's Palace. His wish doesn’t come true because he already made his wish and the coin only grants one. The leprechaun proceeds to saw him in half in front of the horrified crowd.

Scott, who has nearly completely transformed into a leprechaun, and Tammy arrive and warn the people to exit for their safety. Once they leave, Scott battles the leprechaun and burns the pot of gold which causes the leprechaun to burst into flames and Scott to revert to his normal body.

And now they left Las Vegas for somewhere else.

Cast
 Warwick Davis as Lubdan The Leprechaun
 John Gatins as Scott McCoy
 Lee Armstrong as Tammy Larsen
 Caroline Williams as Loretta
 John DeMita as Fazio
 Michael Callan as Mitch
 Tom Dugan as Art
 Marcelo Tubert as Gupta
 Roger Hewlett as Tony
 Heidi Staley as The Fantasy Girl
 Merle Kennedy as Melissa "Mouse" Franklin (uncredited)
 Rod McCary as Father Bob (uncredited)
 Zoe Trilling as Shirley Finnerty (uncredited)
 Terry Lee Crisp as Elvis Presley Impersonator

Production 
After optioning a spec script of his own to Blue Rider Productions, screenwriter David DuBos was given an opportunity to pitch for Leprechaun 3. DuBos, who hadn't seen the previous two films, was only given the guideline of "Leprechaun in Las Vegas" for his pitch. DuBos won against six other writers and had to quickly put together a script due to an impending production start. Brian Trenchard-Smith, director of Night of the Demons 2 was selected to helm the film. Trimark Home Video had considered making the film the final entry in the series. The film was shot over the course of 14 days in Los Angeles, California, with only one day taking place in Las Vegas, Nevada.

Release 
Leprechaun 3 was released direct-to-video on June 27, 1995 by Trimark Home Video, and went on to become the highest selling direct-to-video film of 1995. The studio would release the film on DVD on February 27, 2001. The film was released on blu-ray for the first time by Lionsgate Home Entertainment on September 30, 2014.

Reception 
The film holds a 0% approval rating on the review aggregator website Rotten Tomatoes, based on 4 reviews.

Actor Warwick Davis would later claim the film as his favorite of the series: "I think it tapped into the potential of bringing a comedic element to it all. And Brian Trenchard-Smith, who directed that one, is an incredible director. He manages to get so much out of so little money, and that was what was great about working with him. He really got the humor".

See also
 List of films set in Las Vegas

References

External links
 
 

1995 direct-to-video films
1995 horror films
1995 films
American comedy horror films
American satirical films
American slasher films
1990s English-language films
Direct-to-video horror films
Leprechaun (film series)
Direct-to-video sequel films
American supernatural horror films
Films set in the Las Vegas Valley
Films shot in the Las Vegas Valley
Trimark Pictures films
Films directed by Brian Trenchard-Smith
Films set in Nevada
1990s American films